Ingebjørg Wærstad (4 April 1926 – 7 July 2013) was a Norwegian politician for the Centre Party.

She served as a deputy representative to the Parliament of Norway from Telemark during the term 1973–1977. In total she met during 21 days of parliamentary session. She was a housewife in Nome.

References

1926 births
2013 deaths
People from Nome, Norway
Deputy members of the Storting
Centre Party (Norway) politicians
Politicians from Telemark
Norwegian women in politics
Women members of the Storting